Verin Khotanan is a village in the Kapan Municipality of the Syunik Province in Armenia.

Etymology 
The village is also known as Verkhniy Khotanan and Verev Khotanan.

Demographics 
The Statistical Committee of Armenia reported its population was 199 in 2010, down from 295 at the 2001 census.

Gallery

References 

Populated places in Syunik Province